Beavan is a surname of Welsh origin, meaning "son of Evan". Notable people with the surname include:

Blake Beavan (born 1989), American professional baseball player
Colin Beavan (born 1963), American non-fiction writer and internet blogger
Charles Beavan (1805–1884), British barrister and law reporter
George Beavan (born 1990), English footballer
Jenny Beavan (born 1950), English costume designer
John Beavan, Baron Ardwick (1910–1994), British journalist
Margaret Beavan (1877–1931), English politician, Lord Mayor of Liverpool
Ray Beavan, Australian rugby player
Robert Cecil Beavan (1841–1870), British soldier and ornithologist
Sean Beavan, American record producer

See also
Beavan's Hill, village in Herefordshire, England
Beaven
Bevan
Bevin (disambiguation)
Bevins